Paul Temay (born 4 February 1962) is a former Australian rules footballer who played 52 games for St Kilda in the Victorian Football League (VFL) between 1980 and 1986.

His son, Tom, spent two years on the  list between 2013 and 2014 without playing a senior game.

References

External links

Living people
1962 births
St Kilda Football Club players
Australian rules footballers from Victoria (Australia)